Golgotha (also known as Calvary) was the hill on which Jesus was crucified.

Golgotha or Golgota may also refer to:

 In the Eastern Orthodox Church, a Golgotha is a representation of the crucified Jesus; see Crucifixion in the arts#Eastern church

Literature
 Golgotha, a 1980 thriller novel by John Gardner
 Golgotha, an early 1900s work by Czech poet Josef Svatopluk Machar
 Golgotha (The last days of Christ), a 1937 work by Kannada poet M. Govinda Pai

Music
 Golgotha (oratorio), 1942 oratorio by Franck Martin
 Golgotha (W.A.S.P. album), 2015
 Golgotha (With Blood Comes Cleansing album), 2006
 Golgotha (band), a previous incarnation of the band Acid Bath

Film
 Golgotha (film), a 1935 French film about the death of Jesus Christ
 Golgota, 1966 film Mircea Drăgan

Other uses
 Golgotha (video game), an unreleased computer game
 Golgotha of the Beskids, a Way of the Cross on Matyska hill, Radziechowy village, Silesian Voivodeship, Poland
 Golgotha, Consumatum Est, another name for the 1867 painting Jerusalem by Jean-Léon Gérôme

See also
 Albania's Golgotha: Indictment of the Exterminators of the Albanian People, a German published document of 1913 written by Austrian publicist and politician Leo Freundlich
 Albanian golgotha or Serbian army's retreat through Albania, 1915
 Armenian Golgotha, a 1922 memoir written by Grigoris Balakian
 Calvary (disambiguation)
 Canada's Golgotha, a 1918 bronze sculpture by British sculptor Francis Derwent Wood